Hersey Strosberg is a retired American soccer coach.  He was the head coach of the Clemson Tigers and assistant coach at the University of Virginia.

Education
Strosberg received a B.S. in physical education from SUNY-Cortland in 1997. He also earned a Master's degree in physical education from SUNY-Cortland in 1999.

Coaching career
Strosberg worked in the recruiting operations at both SUNY Cortland and the University of Virginia during his time there.  Strosberg was hired to take over for Todd Bramble at Clemson.  Strosberg was fired after the 2010 season, where he led the Tigers to a 6–13 record, and a 0–10 record in the ACC.  Strosberg's career record with the Tigers was 14-39-1 in three seasons.

Personal life
Strosberg is married to Jessia Strosberg.  The couple were married in 2007.

References

External links

Living people
University of Virginia people
State University of New York at Cortland alumni
Clemson Tigers women's soccer coaches
Year of birth missing (living people)
American soccer coaches